Vitaliy Shumskyi (born 17 May 1972) is a Ukrainian professional football coach and a former player.

Playing career
After playing in Belgium Shumskyi moved to Spain, where he worked in the construction industry. In Madrid, he was the playing coach of the Ukrainian diaspora team - FC Lviv.

Managerial career
Joined FC Lviv for the 2020–21 Ukrainian Premier League and following resignation of Giorgi Tsetsadze as an interim manager gained the club's first win in the season and honored as the best manager of the round by the league.

References

External links
 
 

1972 births
Living people
People from Zolochiv, Lviv Oblast
Ukrainian footballers
FC Skala Stryi (1911) players
FC Hazovyk Komarno players
FC Nyva Ternopil players
FC Karpaty Lviv players
FC Dnipro players
FC Spartak Ivano-Frankivsk players
FC Khutrovyk Tysmenytsia players
FC Dynamo Lviv players
FC Sokil Zolochiv players
FC Rava Rava-Ruska players
Ukrainian Premier League players
Ukrainian First League players
Ukrainian Second League players
Ukrainian expatriate footballers
Expatriate footballers in Belgium
Ukrainian expatriate sportspeople in Belgium
Expatriate footballers in Spain
Ukrainian expatriate sportspeople in Spain
Ukrainian football managers
Ukrainian Premier League managers
Ukrainian Second League managers
FC Nyva Ternopil managers
FC Lviv managers
MFA Mukachevo managers
Association football defenders
Sportspeople from Lviv Oblast